Ali Al-Hawasin (born December 12, 1979) is a footballer from the United Arab Emirates (UAE). He currently plays for Dhafra.

References

External links
 

1979 births
Living people
Emirati footballers
Al-Nasr SC (Dubai) players
Al Ahli Club (Dubai) players
Al-Wasl F.C. players
Al Jazira Club players
Al Dhafra FC players
UAE Pro League players
Association football midfielders
United Arab Emirates international footballers